Sarah Abdurrahman is an American journalist. She is the managing editor of This American Life. Previously, she was the Senior Producer for The Nod. She also worked as a senior producer for Gimlet Media where she launched and ran several shows.

Early life
Abdurrahman is of Libyan heritage.

In college, Abdurrahman studied radio, television, and film with plans to become a filmmaker. However, as her interest in photography grew, she got her master's degree in media studies at The University of Texas.

Career
After graduation, Abdurrahman briefly found employment as a photographer. She was a producer with WNYC's On the Media before becoming the senior producer of The Nod from Gimlet Media. She was announced as the new managing editor of This American Life on March 18, 2020.

Personal life
Abdurrahman is Muslim.

On September 20, 2013, WNYC Studios released an interview with Abdurrahman titled "My Detainment Story or: How I Learned to Stop Feeling Safe in My Own Country and Hate Border Agents*" after she and her family (all US citizens) were detained upon reentry after a trip to Canada. She recounted the difficulty in getting answers about her detainment. In 2014, she a won Front Page award for best Feature in Radio for the piece.

Awards
2014 Gracie for Outstanding Reporter/Correspondent, for her work on WNYC's On the Media Radio
2014 Front Page award for In-Depth Reporting for the "Environmental Nightmare" series

References

External links
 '', an Abdurrahman interview on why she loved working for New York Public Radio
 by The Globe and Mail

Year of birth missing (living people)
Living people
This American Life people
American women journalists
University of Texas alumni
American people of Libyan descent
21st-century American women